in-STEP BLUE is a project management software program developed and sold by microTOOL GmbH, based in Berlin, Germany.  It is designed to assist project managers in developing plans, assigning resources to tasks, tracking progress, managing budgets, requirements, changes and risks as well as analyzing workloads. The tool automatically stores all project results in a central repository shared by all users. Individual project management methods can be supported as well as the agile method Scrum, official methods like the British PRINCE2, the German V-Model XT (Version 1.4), the Swiss HERMES method and methods for the automotive industry according to ISO/IEC 15504, also known as SPICE.

The software is available in English and German and has more than 34,000 registered users worldwide.

Features
In-Step BLUE supports process-based IT-project management with these features:

Project management, project portfolio management and resource management
The tool supports project planning and task management by structuring the specific project  in phases,  iterations,  milestone (project management)s, work packages and activities based on the process used. The project plan gets continually updated.  Editable product templates for project results are provided and versioned. Individual ToDo-lists are assigned to the team members. The progress of the project, time, cost and effort planning can be reported and monitored at all times as time tracking is integrated. The collaboration software can be accessed by all team members via LAN or internet. In case an organization wants to collectively manage several projects running at the same time, the tool supports cross-project views, reports and evaluations. Available resources of an organization can hence be allocated to several projects.
 
Requirements management and change management
All project stakeholders‘ requirements and changes are documented by use of forms, analyzed and prioritized with the tool. Converted into tasks they are visible in the project plan. in-STEP BLUE provides graphic requirements modeling with the UML and standardized documentation. Automatic document versioning guarantees requirements traceability from documentation to test cases to implementation.
 
Configuration management and document management
All activities and project results are versioned and automatically stored in a central product library. To alter a document it has to be checked out and in again. All changes to a configuration item can be seen in the revision history. Baselines can be used to mark significant states within a series of several changes.
 
Risk management
Identified potential risks can be recorded with the tool. Filter functions support the assessment of risks. When the risks are assessed, counter measures can be planned and integrated in the project plan.

Quality management
 Requirements can be linked with test cases and release processes. The tool supports the planning, scheduling and controlling of quality assurance measures. It tracks all documents relevant to an evaluation and offers automated workflows for reviews and QA-cycles. Individual evaluations of tests and test cases can be implemented.

Process management
In organizations running several projects process standards can be established. The tool enables the user to tailor the process to best fit a project’s specific needs. Process standards can be deduced and further improvements gained from successful projects. Process maturity can thus be improved according to CMMI.

Integration with Microsoft programs
in-STEP BLUE is integrated with Microsoft OfficeWord and Excel for corporate documentation. Since version 4.8 it offers features for integration with Microsoft Visual Studio 2010 and Microsoft SharePoint.

History
Version 1.0 of the process and configuration management software in-Step was launched in 1997. Since many companies introduced process-based management according to the Capability Maturity Model (CMM) to improve their software development, the tool was designed to assist project teams in complying with process-based project management. Especially users of the standard for German federal administration and defense, the V-Modell 97, took up the software.

In 2002 in-Step integrated core tasks like project, requirements and configuration management resulting in a multi-user-tool.

Version 3.0 was released in 2004 and offered new editions for requirements-oriented development, for agile projects according to Extreme Programming and for projects according to PRINCE2.
When the new standard for the German federal administration V-Modell XT came out in 2005, a V-Modell XT Edition was launched with features for tailoring the process, project planning and quality assurance.

In 2008 in-Step Scrum Edition and in-Step SPICE Edition for Automotive were completed. In 2010 in-Step HERMES Edition for the Swiss project management method was launched.

In 2014 in-Step got a new name: in-STEP BLUE as another tool with features for requirements engineering was launched: in-STEP RED.

Articles (in German only) 

 Martina Hafner: Projektmanagement-Software. Terminliche Abhängigkeiten im Projekt sichtbarer machen. www.elektronikpraxis.vogel.de. 14. April 2009.
 Hendrik Härter: Projektmanagement-Tool. Komponente für Anforderungsmanagement mit UML und BPMN. www.elektronikpraxis.vogel.de. 26. Oktober 2007.
 Stefan Ueberhorst: Microtool flexibilisiert das Projekt-Management. www.computerwoche.de. 27. März 2007.
 Mey Mark Meyer: PM-Software: in-Step. IT-Projektmanagement mit Vorgehensmodellen. In: GPM-Magazin PMaktuell. 2/2006, S. 50–52.
 Stefan Ueberhorst: in-Step erleichtert Arbeit mit dem V-Modell. www.computerwoche.de. 6. August 2004.

See also
List of project management software
 Project management software
 Project management
 Glossary of project management

External links

microTOOL Blog

Project management software